Wyandance may refer to:

Wyandance, an alternative spelling of Wyandanch (sachem) (ca. 1620-1660), a sachem of the Montaukett Indians
Wyandance, the former name of the town of Wyandanch, New York
, a United States Navy patrol boat in commission from 1917 to 1918